Generation Adidas is a joint venture between Major League Soccer and U.S. Soccer aimed at raising the level of young professional soccer talent in the United States. The program, sponsored by Adidas, offers professional-ready players in the U.S. developmental system not yet eligible for the MLS SuperDraft early entry, allowing MLS to compete with foreign professional clubs without comparable restrictions on player signing. From its establishment in 1997 to 2005, the program was sponsored by Nike and was called Project-40.  Originally intended to improve the U.S. national team player pool, American national team eligibility is no longer required for program entry.

Carlos Parra was the first Project-40 player when he signed with the league and was allocated to the New York/New Jersey MetroStars in 1997. Since then, the program has included players such as Tim Howard, DaMarcus Beasley, Maurice Edu, Carlos Bocanegra, Clint Dempsey, Jozy Altidore, Ben Olsen, Sacha Kljestan, Freddy Adu, Brad Guzan, Michael Bradley, Nick Rimando, Kyle Beckerman and NFL kicker Josh Lambo.

Generation Adidas players do not count against the MLS senior roster and usually earn a much higher salary than the league minimum. Entering into the program automatically classifies a player as professional, and thus disqualifies them from playing college soccer. As a result, Generation Adidas players are also guaranteed scholarships to continue their college education should their professional career not pan out.

From 1998 to 2000, MLS entered a team of Project-40 players, supplemented by other MLS players who did not get much playing time, into the A-League in the USL.

In 2017, MLS introduced Canadian Generation Adidas players, part of a new initiative with the Canadian Soccer Association. Canadian Generation Adidas players count as domestic players on US based MLS teams.

Players

1997

1998

1999

2000

2001

2002

2003

2004

2005

2006

2007

2008

2009

2010

Toronto FC

2011

2012

2013

2014

2015

2016

2017

2018

2019

2020

2021

2022

2023

Project-40 in the A-League

References

External links
 

Major League Soccer
Joint ventures
Adidas